Robert Stuart Jones (born 12 November 1971) is an English former professional footballer who played as a midfielder. He made appearances in the English Football League for Wrexham. He also played for Hyde United.

References

1971 births
Living people
English footballers
Association football midfielders
Wrexham A.F.C. players
Hyde United F.C. players
English Football League players